Aurlandsvangen is the administrative center of Aurland Municipality in Vestland county, Norway. The village is located on the east side of the Aurlandsfjorden (a branch of the main Sognefjorden) where the Aurlandselvi river flows into the fjord. The village of Undredal and the famous Nærøyfjord are located just a few kilometres to the northwest.

The Lærdal Tunnel has its western end on the south side of Aurlandsvangen, and it heads east through the Aurlandsfjellet mountains before reaching the eastern end of the tunnel near Tønjum in Lærdal Municipality.  The tunnel replaces the old Norwegian County Road 5627 which goes over the mountains between Aurland and Lærdal.

The Vangen Church (built 1202) is located in Aurlandsvangen. It contains Aurland Stadion.

Media gallery

References

External links

Villages in Vestland
Aurland